Traditional Japanese architecture uses post-and-lintel structures – vertical posts, connected by horizontal beams. Rafters are traditionally the only structural member used in Japanese timber framing that is neither horizontal nor vertical. The rest of the structure is non-load-bearing.

While fixed walls are used, a variety of movable partitions are also used to fill the spaces between the pillars. They may be free-standing, hung from lintels, or, especially in later buildings, sliding panels which can readily be removed from their grooves. Their type, number, and position is adjusted according to the weather without and the activities within. They are used to modify the view, light, temperature, humidity, and ventilation, and to divide the interior space.

Pictorial overview

By type

Hanging

Free-standing

Sliding

Fixed (walls)

See also
JAANUS; free online Japanese architectural dictionary

Notes

References

Japanese architectural features
Partitions in traditional Japanese architecture